Felipe Peralta (born 2 May 1962) is a retired football midfielder from Paraguay. He played professional football in Paraguay, and also had a spell in Colombia, playing for Deportivo Pereira.

International 
Sanabria made his international debut for the Paraguay national football team on 14 June 1991 in a Copa Paz del Chaco match against Bolivia (0-1 win). He obtained a total number of five international caps, scoring no goals for the national side.

1962 births
Living people
Paraguayan footballers
Paraguay international footballers
Paraguayan expatriate footballers
Association football midfielders
Expatriate footballers in Colombia
Deportivo Pereira footballers
1991 Copa América players
Sportivo Luqueño players